Grevillea brachystylis , also known as short-styled grevillea, is a species of flowering plant in the family Proteaceae and is endemic to the south-west of Western Australia. It is a low, spreading to erect shrub with linear to narrow egg-shaped leaves with the narrow end towards the base, and wheel-like clusters of hairy red flowers.

Description
Grevillea brachystylis is a low, spreading to erect shrub that typically grows to a height of
.

Taxonomy
Grevillea brachystylis was first formally described in 1845 by Carl Meissner in Johann Georg Christian Lehmann's Plantae Preissianae from specimens collected in 1839. The specific epithet (brachystylis) means "short style".

In 1990, Gregory John Keighery described two subspecies in the journal Nuytsia, and the names are accepted by the Australian Plant Census:

In 2009, Keighery described a third subspecies in The Western Australian Naturalist, and the name is also accepted by the Australian Plant Census:
 Grevillea brachystylis subsp. grandis Keighery has longer, wider leaves and a longer pedicel than the autonym.

Distribution and habitat
Short-styled grevillea grows in swampy places and on stream banks in the Busselton and Scott River areas in the far south-west of Western Australia. Subspecies australis grows in heath and is restricted to the Scott River area, subsp. brachystylis grows in heath or woodland east of Busselton on the coastal plain and subsp. grandis grows in woodland on the Whicher Range.

Conservation status
Subspecies brachystylis is listed as "Priority Three" by the Government of Western Australia Department of Biodiversity, Conservation and Attractions, meaning that it is poorly known and known from only a few locations but is not under imminent threat, and subspecies australis and grandis are listed as "Threatened Flora (Declared Rare Flora — Extant)". Subspecies grandis is also listed as "critically endangered" under the Australian Government Environment Protection and Biodiversity Conservation Act 1999, and a National Recovery Plan has been prepared. The main threats to the species include road maintenance, weed invasion and inappropriate fire regimes.

References

brachystylis
Eudicots of Western Australia
Proteales of Australia
Taxa named by Carl Meissner
Plants described in 1848